The Carmichael Show is an American sitcom television series created by Nicholas Stoller, Jerrod Carmichael, Ari Katcher, and Willie Hunter that premiered on August 26, 2015, on NBC and concluded on August 9, 2017, after three seasons and 32 episodes. Starring Carmichael, it follows a fictional version of his family. The multi-camera show is set in Charlotte, North Carolina.

On May 15, 2016, NBC renewed the series for a 13-episode third season, which premiered with back-to-back episodes on May 31, 2017. On June 30, 2017, NBC canceled the series after three seasons when Carmichael announced that he would be departing to pursue other projects. The series received positive reviews throughout its run.

Premise
The Carmichael Show follows a fictional version of comedian Jerrod Carmichael's family, set in Charlotte, North Carolina. Family members include Jerrod's father Joe, mother Cynthia, and brother Bobby. Other characters include Jerrod's live-in girlfriend (later wife) Maxine, and Bobby's estranged wife Nekeisha. Episodes often tackle serious societal issues and current events in a humorous context.

Cast and characters
 Jerrod Carmichael as a fictional version of himself, and the titular protagonist of the show.
 Amber Stevens West as Maxine North (later Maxine North-Carmichael), Jerrod's girlfriend. Jerrod and Maxine get married towards the end of the third season.
 Lil Rel Howery as Robert "Bobby" Carmichael, Jerrod's brother. 
 Tiffany Haddish as Nekeisha Williams-Carmichael, Bobby's estranged (later, ex-) wife and, from mid-series, roommate.
 Loretta Devine as Cynthia Carmichael, Joe's wife and the mother of Jerrod and Bobby. 
 David Alan Grier as Joe Carmichael, Cynthia's husband and the father of Jerrod and Bobby.

Episodes

Production

Development and filming
Carmichael began developing and executive producing the series in November 2014, based upon his real life as a stand-up and his family. On December 18, 2014, the series was given the title Go Jerrod, Go. On March 10, 2015, NBC ordered the pilot to series under the final title The Carmichael Show, with six episodes to air during the summer.

On September 14, 2015, the series was renewed by NBC for a second season of 13 episodes, which premiered on Wednesday, March 9 with a sneak preview episode after The Voice. It then premiered in its regular timeslot Sunday, March 13, 2016, at 9/8c with back-to-back episodes.

On June 14, 2017, after mass shootings in Virginia and San Francisco, NBC pulled the episode "Shoot-Up-Able," which saw Carmichael's character surviving a mass shooting physically unharmed but psychologically scarred, from airing. It eventually aired on June 28.

Casting
On December 18, 2014, Loretta Devine was cast as Carmichael's mother, and Amber Stevens West as Carmichael's girlfriend. On January 5, 2015, David Alan Grier was cast to play Carmichael's father. On January 7, 2015, Lil Rel Howery was cast to play Carmichael's brother.

Reception

Ratings

Critical reception

The series has received positive reviews. On Metacritic, the first season has a score of 64 out of 100, based on 15 critics, generally praising the show for its originality; one described it as "a smart and crafty comedy". The second season received better reviews, with a score of 80 out of 100 on Metacritic, indicative of "generally favorable reviews"; critics praise the series for its writing and the topics it discusses. The third season also received "generally favorable reviews" with a score of 79 out of 100, based on 8 critics.

On Rotten Tomatoes, the first season has received 72% "fresh" ratings, with an average rating of 6.1. The second season received 100% "fresh" ratings, with an average rating of 8.4. As of late 2022, the third season has received an 89% "fresh" rating on Rotten Tomatoes, with an average rating of 7.8. TV critic Alan Sepinwall wrote, with regard to the third season, "Few sitcoms are built to handle the kind of provocative content that The Carmichael Show embraces as its reason for being... Carmichael not only keeps the jokes flying the whole time, but makes them better when it's at its most Very Special."

Accolades

References

External links
 
 
 The Carmichael Show on Instagram

2010s American black sitcoms
2015 American television series debuts
2017 American television series endings
English-language television shows
NBC original programming
Television series about families
Television series by A24
Television series by Universal Television
Television series by 20th Century Fox Television
Television shows set in North Carolina